Byron Collins Van Houten (December 19, 1848 – January 25, 1904) was an American politician in the state of Washington. He served in the Washington State Senate from 1891 to 1897. From 1895 to 1897, he was President pro tempore of the Senate.

He was profiled in the brochure for the Northwest Industrial Exposition held in Spokane Falls in October 1890.

References

Republican Party Washington (state) state senators
1848 births
1904 deaths
19th-century American politicians